The .585 Nyati (14.9×71mm) is a shoulder-fired rifle cartridge. Nyati (n-ya-te) means Cape Buffalo in many African languages such as Swahili. The .585 Nyati can generate  of muzzle energy.  This places it at or near the top of the list for most powerful cartridges that can be chambered in a rifle that can still be carried afield.

History 
The .585 Nyati was developed by Ross Seyfried. He was motivated by the desire to create a rifle with tremendous stopping power at a fraction of the cost of expensive double guns such as the various Nitro Express rounds.

The rims were turned from .577 Nitro brass and the case blown out straight to allow formation of enough of a shoulder for headspace purposes. Brass formed by this method, during the developmental phase, had a relatively weak case head because the parent .577 Nitro case was designed for a double rifle which supports the case head all the way to the rim.  In a bolt-action rifle, a portion of the case head is unsupported and requires more strength in that area.

See also
.577 Tyrannosaur
List of rifle cartridges
13 mm caliber

References

External links

Pistol and rifle cartridges